The Shesh Aba raid was a raid by the British Special Air Service in Shesh Aba village, Nimruz Province, Afghanistan on August 7, 2012 during which British armed forces killed two young parents and injured their two sons. The commander of the special forces did not report the fatal incident to military police.

Raid 
The raid occurred in the early morning of August 7, 2012, during the American War in Afghanistan (2001–2021). The night prior, two unknown men visited the home of the Abdul Aziz Uzbakzai. The men accepted the family's customary hospitality and left at 10pm. Shortly after, the people in the family home included Abdul Aziz Uzbakzai; his son, Hussain; Hussain's wife Ruqqia, and their sons, Imran (aged three years), Bilal (aged one and a half). At 3am, the British special forces Special Air Service undertook what they called a "Kill/Capture raid". They arrived in Shesh Aba village via helicopter, entered the family home while discharging firearms, and woke Abdul Aziz before blindfolding, handcuffing, beating and interrogating him, as per his claims. After the military left, Abdul Aziz realised that Hussain and Ruqqia had been killed and saw bullet wounds to their heads. Both Abdul Aziz's grandsons were missing, he later learned that they were taken away by the special forces due to injuries sustained in the raid. Bilal had bullet injuries to his face and shoulder and Imran had a bullet wound to his abdomen. 

The same morning, 12-year-old neighbouring boy Mohammad Mohammad also found his two older brothers Mohammad Wali (aged 26) and Mohammad Juma (aged 28) dead with bullet wounds to their heads.

Aftermath 

British military law obliges military commanders to inform military police if there is a possibility of an unlawful killing or grievous bodily harm offence having been committed. In the context of two children being injured and one woman being killed, the BBC received advice from a Royal Military Police former investigator who stated that there was "no question in my mind that this incident should have been referred to military police". A  British armed forces Serious Incident Review was undertaken, but the circumstances of the raid was not referred to military police.

Mark Carleton-Smith, was the director of British Special Forces at the time of the raid.

Abdul Aziz claims to have rejected financial compensation.

In 2022 the Royal Military Police stated that they were investigating the raid as a result of it being featured by BBC Panorama.

See also 

 Night raid on Narang
 Afghanistan night raids

References 

2012 in Afghanistan
War in Afghanistan (2001–2021) casualties
Civilian casualties in the War in Afghanistan (2001–2021)
Massacres in Afghanistan
Civilians in war
Mass murder in 2012
History of Nimruz Province
August 2012 events in Afghanistan
Special Air Service operations